James Donlan (July 23, 1888 – June 7, 1938) was an American actor. Born in San Francisco, California, Donlan appeared in 107 films between 1929 and 1939. He was the father of actress Yolande Donlan.

On June 7, 1938, Donlan died, aged 49, from a heart attack.

Selected filmography

 Big News (1929) - Deke
 Wise Girls (1929) - Ben Wade
 The Bishop Murder Case (1930) - Ernest Heath
 Beau Bandit (1930) - Buck - Posse Member
 The Fall Guy (1930) - The Bill Collector
 The Sins of the Children (1930) - Bide Taylor
 Night Work (1930) - Mr. McEvoy (uncredited)
 Danger Lights (1930) - Picnic Barker (uncredited)
 Remote Control (1930) - Blodgett
 Mothers Cry (1930) - City Editor (uncredited)
 The Painted Desert (1931) - Steve - Ore Wagon #2 Shotgun Rider (uncredited)
 Dance, Fools, Dance (1931) - Clinton (uncredited)
 The Front Page (1931) - Reporter (uncredited)
 Daybreak (1931) - Drunk Inviting Laura to Dance (uncredited)
 The Good Bad Girl (1931) - Police Sgt. Donovan
 A Free Soul (1931) - Reporter (uncredited)
 Sporting Blood (1931) - Jim, a Trainer (uncredited)
 Five Star Final (1931) - Reporter in Speakeasy (uncredited)
 Men of Chance (1931) - Clark
 The Final Edition (1932) - Freddie
 Are You Listening? (1932) - Butch (uncredited)
 Huddle (1932) - Heckler at Game (uncredited)
 Is My Face Red? (1932) - Reporter (uncredited)
 Crooner (1932) - Non-Fan with Radio (uncredited)
 Back Street (1932) - Profhero
 Thirteen Women (1932) - Mike - the Detective (uncredited)
 Air Mail (1932) - Passenger Passing Out Cigars (uncredited)
 Madison Square Garden (1932) - Sports Reporter (uncredited)
 The Conquerors (1932) - Joe - Stockbroker (uncredited)
 The Death Kiss (1932) - Max Hill (uncredited)
 The Penguin Pool Murder (1932) - Fink
 The Half-Naked Truth (1932) - Lou - Press Agent (uncredited)
 They Just Had to Get Married (1932) - Clark
 20,000 Years in Sing Sing (1932) - Reporter #1 (uncredited)
 What! No Beer? (1933) - Al (uncredited)
 Mystery of the Wax Museum (1933) - Morgue Attendant (uncredited)
 Grand Slam (1933) - Reporter with False Reno News (uncredited)
 Central Airport (1933) - Havana Driver (uncredited)
 The Working Man (1933) - Hartland Co. Man (uncredited)
 Hell Below (1933) - Seaman Muller (uncredited)
 The Nuisance (1933) - Photographer (uncredited)
 The Life of Jimmy Dolan (1933) - Man Offering Jimmy a Drink (uncredited)
 Heroes for Sale (1933) - Laundry Cashier (uncredited)
 The Mayor of Hell (1933) - Sam (uncredited)
 College Humor (1933) - Marcus Lafflin
 I Love That Man (1933) - Reporter (uncredited)
 Pilgrimage (1933) - Barber (uncredited)
 The Avenger (1933) - Durant
 Doctor Bull (1933) - Harry Weems - Supporter #3 for Dr. Bull (uncredited)
 I Loved a Woman (1933) - Voting Returns Announcer (uncredited)
 Only Yesterday (1933) - (uncredited)
 College Coach (1933) - Reporter (uncredited)
 From Headquarters (1933) - Relaxing Reporter (uncredited)
 Design for Living (1933) - Fat Man with Ring (uncredited)
 Hi Nellie! (1934) - Evans (uncredited)
 Dark Hazard (1934) - Man Advising Jim at Dog Track (uncredited)
 I've Got Your Number (1934) - Mr. Talley (uncredited)
 Gambling Lady (1934) - Joe - Syndicate Lawyer (uncredited)
 A Very Honorable Guy (1934) - Mr. O'Toole
 Now I'll Tell (1934) - Honey Smith
 Midnight Alibi (1934) - Marty - the Bail Bondsman (uncredited)
 Paris Interlude (1934) - Jones - Times Reporter (uncredited)
 The Cat's-Paw (1934) - Red - the Reporter
 Belle of the Nineties (1934) - Kirby
 Wake Up and Dream (1934) - Jim (uncredited)
 Babbitt (1934) - Maxwell, Reisling's Attorney (uncredited)
 The Man Who Reclaimed His Head (1934) - Danglas - Man in Theatre Box (uncredited)
 Romance in Manhattan (1935) - Mr. Harris - Cab Manager (uncredited)
 Under Pressure (1935) - Corky
 The Whole Town's Talking (1935) - Detective Sergeant Howe
 Life Begins at 40 (1935) - Farmer (uncredited)
 Traveling Saleslady (1935) - Andy McNeill
 The Case of the Curious Bride (1935) - Detective Fritz
 Go Into Your Dance (1935) - Mr. A.J. Squires (uncredited)
 In Caliente (1935) - Swanson (uncredited)
 The Girl from 10th Avenue (1935) - First Detective (uncredited)
 The Murder Man (1935) - Bartender #2 (uncredited)
 The Daring Young Man (1935) - Captain of the Prison Guard (uncredited)
 Hot Tip (1935) - Bill - Racetrack Bettor (uncredited)
 Here Comes the Band (1935) - Joe (uncredited)
 Redheads on Parade (1935) - Minor Role (uncredited)
 Dr. Socrates (1935) - Salesman in Car (uncredited)
 Thanks a Million (1935) - Diner Counterman (uncredited)
 Ah, Wilderness! (1935) - Salesman in Bar (uncredited)
 We're Only Human (1935) - Detective Casey (uncredited)
 Exclusive Story (1936) - Managing Editor (uncredited)
 Boulder Dam (1936) - Nightclub Manager (uncredited)
 Murder on a Bridle Path (1936) - Detective Kane
 The Ex-Mrs. Bradford (1936) - Taxi Driver (uncredited)
 The Crime of Dr. Forbes (1936) - Coroner (uncredited)
 Crash Donovan (1936) - Smokey
 The Plot Thickens (1936) - Jim
 A Family Affair (1937) - 'Daily Star' Reporter (uncredited)
 Oh, Doctor (1937) - Mr. Stoddard (uncredited)
 This Is My Affair (1937) - Reporter
 Hotel Haywire (1937) - Swanlee (uncredited)
 It Happened in Hollywood (1937) - Shorty
 Music for Madame (1937) - Suspect with Cold (uncredited)
 Borrowing Trouble (1937) - Casey (uncredited)
 Everybody Sing (1938) - Stage Doorman (uncredited)
 Test Pilot (1938) - Photographer (uncredited)
 Professor Beware (1938) - Reporter at Museum (uncredited)
 The Crowd Roars (1938) - Announcer at Smoker (uncredited)
 Babes in Arms (1939) - Fred (uncredited) (final film role)

References

External links

1888 births
1938 deaths
Male actors from San Francisco
American male film actors
American male silent film actors
20th-century American male actors